"When Mercy Found Me" is a song by Christian Alternative-Southern Rock group Rhett Walker Band from their debut studio album, Come to the River via Essential Records. It was released on April 23, 2012. It was the first single from the album and band.

Background 
This song was written by Jeff Pardo and Rhett Walker. According to Walker, it is his personal testimony of faith.

"When Mercy Found Me" was digitally released as the lead debut single from Come to the River on April 23, 2012 via Essential Records.

The band released an official lyric video of the song on YouTube.

Reception 
Worship Leader claimed the song "declares the love and grace of a merciful Savior".

Charts

Weekly charts

Year-end charts

References 

2012 singles
2012 songs
Songs written by Jeff Pardo
Essential Records (Christian) singles